Dederiyeh Cave is a cave in Mount Simeon, Syria, in which systematic excavations have taken place since 1987. Two Neanderthal children were found in the cave, in 1993 and 1997–1998, both of which showed evidence that they were buried.

Description
The cave consists of a chamber, 15 meters wide and 8 meters high, rising up to 10 meters in the back where a chimney is a second exit, and 50 meters deep. The main entrance is north and overlooks the wadi.

Excavations
Tentative excavations took place in 1989 and 1990, and more serious research started in 1993; it quickly yielded the remains of a Neanderthal child, about two years old, an almost complete set of remains. A second (partial) skeleton was found in 1997–1998, in a pit of 70x50 cm, filled with fine brown dirt in which flint were found. The researchers concluded that this also was intentionally buried.

In all the remains of up to fifteen individuals have been found in the Middle Paleolithic layers of the cave. More than half of them were children.

See also 

 Fossil
 List of fossil sites (with link directory)
 List of human evolution fossils (with images)

References

Afrin District
Paleolithic sites
Paleolithic Asia
Archaeological sites in Morocco
Caves of Asia
Human evolution
Paleoanthropological sites